Wayne Kerr (born 14 March 1985) is an Irish professional rugby league footballer who played for Oldham (Heritage № 1242) in the Championship One. He is an Ireland international. He has previously played for London Skolars and Carlow Crusaders.

Background
Kerr was born in Dublin, Ireland. Nicknamed "Slasher" on account of his aggressive and athletic playing style. He grew up in Co. Kildare.

Playing career
He was a member of the Ireland squad for the 2008 Rugby League World Cup, and went on to make one appearance in the tournament.

He now plays Rugby Union with Cill Dara RFC. He plays blindside flanker (number 6).

In 2016, he was called up to the Ireland squad for the 2017 Rugby League World Cup European Pool B qualifiers.

References

External links
Statistics at rugbyleagueproject.org
Ireland profile
Ireland line up Richards for World Cup duty
Ireland 58-18 Russia

1985 births
Living people
Expatriate rugby league players in England
Ireland national rugby league team players
Irish expatriate rugby league players
Irish expatriate sportspeople in England
Irish rugby league players
Irish rugby union players
London Skolars players
Oldham R.L.F.C. players
Rugby articles needing expert attention
Rugby league players from County Dublin
Rugby league props